The Národný atletický štadión (National athletics stadium) is a multi-purpose stadium in Banská Bystrica, Slovakia. It is currently used mostly for athletics and football matches and the home ground of MFK Dukla Banská Bystrica. The stadium has a capacity of 7,381 all seats.

History 
Construction of this centrally-located stadium in Banská Bystrica (part Štiavničky) was launched in 1957 and lasted two years. Opened was 22 August 1959 with capacity of almost 15.000 spectators.

2018-2021 reconstruction
In 2018 began reconstruction of the stadium to meet IIAF and UEFA 3 stars criteria. Original capacity was decreased to 7,381 spectators (all-seated). The estimated cost of €14.1 million was paid by Slovak government. The stadium is owned by Ministry of Defence Slovak Republic.

EYOF 2022 
Národný atletický štadión hosted athletics at the 2022 European Youth Summer Olympic Festival, from 25 to 30 July 2022.

References

FK Dukla Banská Bystrica
Football venues in Slovakia
Multi-purpose stadiums in Slovakia
Buildings and structures in Banská Bystrica
Tourist attractions in Banská Bystrica Region
Sport in Banská Bystrica Region
Sports venues completed in 1959